Fire suppression systems are used to extinguish, control, or in some cases, entirely prevent fires from spreading or occurring. Fire suppression systems have an incredibly large variety of applications, and as such, there are many different types of suppression systems for different applications being used today. Of these, there are some that are still in use but are no longer legal to manufacture and produce.

Suppression systems 

Fire suppression systems are governed by the codes under the National Fire Protection Association, also known as the NFPA. This organization writes codes, regulations, and recommendations on the proper installation and maintenance of these fire suppression systems. Likewise, the NFPA also lists criteria that must be met for the requirements of certain types of fire suppression systems.

Types 

 Fire sprinkler systems
 Wet pipe 
 Wet pipe antifreeze
 Dry pipe
 Pre-action
 Deluge
 Electronic
 Foam water sprinkler
 Water spray
 Water mist
 Gaseous agents
 Chemical agent systems
 Wet chemical
 Dry chemical
 Fully automatic suppression systems
 Fully automatic vehicle fire suppression systems
 Manual vehicle fire suppression systems
 External water spray system

Fire sprinkler systems 
A fire sprinkler system is an active fire protection method, consisting of a water supply system, providing adequate pressure and flowrate to a water distribution piping system, onto which fire sprinklers are connected. Although historically only used in factories and large commercial buildings, systems for homes and small buildings are now available at a cost-effective price. Fire sprinkler systems are extensively used worldwide, with over 40 million sprinkler heads fitted each year. In buildings completely protected by fire sprinkler systems, over 96% of fires were controlled by fire sprinklers alone.

See also 
Fire Equipment Manufacturers' Association
National Fire Protection Association

References

Firefighting equipment
Fire suppression
Active fire protection